Colonel Charles Napier Sturt (9 August 1832 – 13 March 1886) was an English soldier and politician.

Sturt was born in London in 1832, the son of Henry Sturt of Dorset and Charlotte Penelope Brudenell, daughter of the Robert Brudenell, 6th Earl of Cardigan. In 1851 he joined the Grenadier Guards; in 1854 he served with 3rd Battalion in the Crimea War, where he was seriously wounded at the Battle of Inkerman.

On returning from the war Sturt stood as Member of Parliament for Dorchester and was elected in a by-election in July 1856. He was MP for Dorchester 1856 to 1874.

Sturt died at Winchester Barrack on 13 March 1886, aged 54.

References

1832 births
1886 deaths
British Army personnel of the Crimean War
Grenadier Guards officers
Conservative Party (UK) MPs for English constituencies
UK MPs 1852–1857
UK MPs 1857–1859
UK MPs 1859–1865
UK MPs 1865–1868
UK MPs 1868–1874